Farmland generally refers to agricultural land, or land (typically Arable land) currently used for the purposes of farming. It may also refer to:

Farmland Assessment Act of 1964, provides for reduced taxes on farmland in New Jersey
Farmland development rights in Suffolk County, New York, a program to purchase development rights for farmland
Farmland (film), a documentary film about agriculture in the United States
Farmland, Indiana, a town in the United States
Farmland Industries, founded in 1929 as the Union Oil Company, later renamed Consumers Cooperative Association (CCA) and Farmland Industries, Inc. 
Farmland preservation, an effort to set aside and protect examples of a region's farmland for the use, education, and enjoyment of future generations
Farmland protection, programs in the United States designed to limit conversion of agricultural land to other uses